Raphael Tsu (born December 27, 1931) is a Fellow of the American Physical Society and is Professor Emeritus of electrical engineering at the University of North Carolina at Charlotte, Charlotte, NC.

Early life and education
Tsu was born to a Catholic family in Shanghai, China, in 1931. As a child he was inspired by his great uncle who in 1926 was amongst the first six Chinese bishops ever to be consecrated at the Vatican in Rome and as a teenager by his US-educated father, Adrian, and French-educated uncle, Louis. His paternal grandfather and great uncle were pioneers in power plant and modern shipyard in Shanghai. While leaving Shanghai, his great uncle, on his death bed told him to remember the old Chinese saying that to succeed requires the right tool.

Tsu initially emigrated to the west in 1952 to study physics at Medway Technical College in England for one year before leaving for Dayton, OH, the following year. He earned the bachelors of science at the University of Dayton in 1956 and spent one semester at Carnegie Institute of Technology (predecessor to Carnegie Mellon University) before going to Ohio State University to earn an M.S. in 1957 and a Ph.D. in 1960. At Ohio State, Tsu worked primarily under Robert Kouyoumjian.

Career
After several years working as a member of the technical staff at Bell Laboratories (BTL) at Murray Hill, NJ, developing an ultrasonic amplifier, a mechanism invented by D. L. White, Tsu moved to the IBM, T.J. Watson Research Center in Yorktown Heights, NY as an associate to Leo Esaki beginning a well-known collaboration that yielded a theory of man-made quantum materials, superlattices and quantum wells.

Tsu later joined the Amorphous Semiconductors Institute (ASI) and directed energy research at Energy Conversion Devices (ECD) near Detroit, MI, as invited by inventor Stan Ovshinsky. His contribution included the first experimental determination of the volume fraction of crystallinity for conductivity percolation in amorphous silicon and [germanium], and providing experimental proof of the existence of an intermediate order. He discovered experimentally that post annealing with H2 and O2 can drastically remove dangling bond defects in amorphous silicon.

From 1985 to 1987, Tsu served as the amorphous silicon program group leader at the National Renewable Energy Laboratory (then known as SERI, Solar Energy Research Institute) in Golden, CO. His theoretical derivation of the relationship between optical absorption and disorder in amorphous silicon and germanium in terms of fundamental constants shows that the slope of the Tauc plot is uniquely determined by the oscillator strength of the transition, the deformation potential, and the mean deviation of the atomic coordinates obtained from the RDF.

In 1972, Tsu organized a group and was invited by the Chinese Science Academy that resulted in the first report on the technology in China published in Scientific American. This led to his involvement through establishing the first Chinese Scientific delegation visit to the US invited by the US-China Relations Committee of the US Academy of Science. During this visit, he worked with the US State Department for the program and logistics on the East Coast. This effort contributed to the opening of scientific exchange between the United States and China.

Invention of the superlattice

Of all his contributions, Tsu's most important impact has been in the invention of spatially modulated, or periodically layered, materials – the superlattice. The structure of a superlattice has remained a highly productive innovation in nanoelectronics well into this century. Indeed, Tsu played a pivotal role in the creation, invention, and development of synthetic periodic superlattice materials and devices that functionally depend on these artificially fabricated two-dimensional multiple-quantum well structures while working in Leo Esaki’s Exploratory Device Research Group in the IBM Watson Laboratories. Tsu introduced the idea of alternating layers of different material, A/B, with the correct band-edge offset. While at IBM, Tsu worked closely with another notable scientist, the late L. L. Chang. Ray's theoretical analysis at IBM led to the important concept of modulation doping for carrier mobility enhancement independently of, and prior to, the work of Dingle, et al. at Bell Labs.

Contributions to other technologies
These pioneering contributions have led to many current technologies including terahertz oscillators, negative differential conductance (NDC) in the I-V characteristics of superlattice devices, resonant tunneling quantum well (double barrier) structures, of phonon band folding and the related Raman spectra, and the discovery of forbidden phonon modes. Raphael Tsu's other contributions have impacted a wide range of materials science.

A leitmotif in Tsu's career has been ubiquitous electron–lattice interactions in materials as well as quantum transport. One of his first publications from Bell Labs is concerned with radiation of phonons by non-accelerating charges. Another from IBM, is related to phonons and polaritons. He and Timir Datta have introduced the concept of wave impedance in quantum transport for dissipation-free quantum waves, where using the expressions for probability continuity and energy expectation an equation for quantum wave impedance of Schrödinger functions is obtained.

Notable Papers

The following two papers were amongst the 50 most cited articles to appear in the first fifty years of the journal Applied Physics Letters published by the American Institute of Physics (AIP) and were featured as such in APL's 50th anniversary issue http://apl.aip.org/apl_50th_anniversary .

References

External links
 

1931 births
Fellows of the American Physical Society
Living people
Ohio State University College of Engineering alumni
Scientists from Shanghai
Semiconductor physicists
University of Dayton alumni
University of North Carolina at Charlotte faculty